is an action-RPG developed by XTALSOFT and published by DOG for the Family Computer Disk System in Japan in 1987.

The story
Kalin no Tsurugi takes place in the peaceful Altenia Kingdom. Recently, however, monsters have been appearing. To help combat these monsters, the King calls forth his best knight: you. Your purpose is twofold: you must find the mage Gladrif and defeat the monsters terrorizing the townspeople.

External links
 Square Enix Kalin no Tsurugi Page

Role-playing video games
Action role-playing video games
Famicom Disk System games
Famicom Disk System-only games
Japan-exclusive video games
Square (video game company) games
1987 video games
Video games developed in Japan